KRWG-TV, virtual channel 22 (UHF digital channel 23), is a Public Broadcasting Service (PBS) member television station licensed to Las Cruces, New Mexico, United States. The station is owned by the Regents of New Mexico State University. KRWG-TV's studios are located at Milton Hall on the NMSU campus in Las Cruces, and its transmitter is located atop Tortugas Mountain in central Doña Ana County (east of the Las Cruces city limits). On cable, the station is available on Comcast Xfinity channel 2 in Las Cruces and Charter Spectrum channel 4 in El Paso, Texas (El Paso-based CBS affiliate KDBC-TV, which broadcasts on virtual channel 4, is instead carried on channel 3), and in high definition on Xfinity digital channel 220 and Spectrum digital channel 886.

KRWG-TV's signal is relayed on low-power translator stations across southwestern New Mexico.

History
The station first signed on the air on June 29, 1973; its call letters were named after Ralph Willis Goddard, an educator and pioneer broadcaster in Las Cruces, who was employed as an instructor at the college; Goddard founded Albuquerque AM radio station KOB (now KKOB). The KRWG call letters were first used by the sister radio station at 90.7 FM that signed on in 1964.

KRWG was the only public television station to serve the El Paso–Las Cruces media market until 1978, when KCOS-TV signed on as the PBS member station for El Paso. Prior to that date, viewers in the eastern portion of the market (which corresponds to the city of El Paso) would have to view most PBS programming on cable by way of out-of-market member station KNME or KRWG. Some PBS programs, including Sesame Street, were carried in El Paso by KTSM-TV (channel 9).

The station produces a weeknight newscast titled News22, which is one of the few student-produced broadcasts among the journalism schools in the United States, as well as the weekly newsmagazine Newsmakers.

Digital television

Digital channels
The station's digital signal is multiplexed:

Translators

Analog-to-digital conversion
KRWG-TV shut down its analog signal, over UHF channel 22, on June 10, 2009 (two days before most full-power television stations in the United States transitioned from analog to digital broadcasts under federal mandate on June 12). The station's digital signal remained on its pre-transition UHF channel 23. Through the use of PSIP, digital television receivers display the station's virtual channel as its former UHF analog channel 22.

References

External links
KRWG-TV official website

New Mexico State University
PBS member stations
Television channels and stations established in 1973
RWG-TV
1973 establishments in New Mexico